Chris Bathgate (born 21 April 1982) is an American indie folk singer-songwriter and musician. He is prominent in the Ann Arbor and Ypsilanti folk music scene in Michigan. In 2007, Bathgate signed to Quite Scientific Records, on which he released his most prominent album to date, A Cork Tale Wake. His most recent release was Salt Year, a full-length album released on 26 April 2011. Bathgate has been compared to folk singer-songwriters Sufjan Stevens, Iron & Wine, and Damien Jurado.

Biography

Early life
Chris Bathgate was born in Ames, Iowa on 21 April 1982. He began playing music at the age of 16, and relocated to Ann Arbor, Michigan to attend the University of Michigan as an Art & Design student.

Early career
Bathgate started out in a heavy metal band for several years before turning to folk. While in Ann Arbor, Bathgate then formed the folk trio Ambitious Brothers with Michael Beauchamp and Karl Sturk, releasing a few records before breaking up in 2005.

During a trip to Northern Michigan, Bathgate and fellow University of Michigan student Jansen Swy along with other friends set music to Swy's poetry, calling the short-lived project The Descent of the Holy Ghost Church. Later on, while attending the New England Literature Program, a University of Michigan summer program in Maine, Descent resurfaced when the group managed to book itself as an opening act for Magnolia Electric Company at Detroit's Magic Stick. The group, which included Matt Jones, Louis Dickinson, and Carol Gray, disbanded in 2006.

Solo career
In 2001, Bathgate launched his solo career, while continuing to experiment with different groups for several years. He self-released multiple EPs and albums including Twilight Unlimited in 2002, Create and Consume in 2003, and Silence Is For Suckers in 2005. He would often sell his records to local Ann Arbor music store Encore Records.

In 2006, Bathgate simultaneously released two albums, A Detailed Account of Three Dreams and Throatsleep, as well as an EP, The Single Road I Longed For. During the year, Real Detroit Weekly named Bathgate 'Best Solo Artist in Michigan'.

In 2007, Bathgate linked up with Saturday Looks Good To Me as an opening act for their European tour.

Later in 2007, Bathgate signed to Michigan record label Quite Scientific Records, on which he released A Cork Tale Wake on 26 June. He spent the remainder of the year on a national tour. The album received high praise for its "bruised sounding beauty" and short, simple songs that "let his voice do the talking". On 15 January 2008, NPR Music chose the opening track "Serpentine" as its Song of the Day. A Cork Tale Wake was released in the UK on Tangled Up!/One Little Indian.

In February 2008, Bathgate released a limited EP, Wait, Skeleton, on Quite Scientific Records.

In March 2008, 2009, and 2011, Bathgate played at the SXSW Music Festival in Austin, TX.

April 2011 saw the release of his second nationally distributed full length, "Salt Year" on Quite Scientific Records.

Musical style
Bathgate's music has been described as "stripped down with liberal amounts of acoustic guitar, piano, strings, and even a little horn work here and there", with all these instruments meant to "complement Bathgate's voice".

Lyrics and songwriting
Bathgate often references hometown Ann Arbor, Michigan sites in his songs. He references a local Ann Arbor street, Ann St., in "The Last Parade On Ann St.".  Bathgate lived at 609 Ann St. "Madison House" refers to the former backyard music venue Madison House in Ann Arbor.

Style of live shows
Bathgate is known for a using a wide range of techniques, instruments, and supporting musicians during live shows.

Early in his career, he would play Hayden Carruth poems, read by him, through the amp, as he intertwined his music. He has used loop pedals to layer his instruments and vocals during shows, an e-bow on his electric guitar to mimic the sound of bows on strings, and a mountain dulcimer.

Influences
Bathgate has cited influences including American novelists John Steinbeck and Kurt Vonnegut, poets Suzanne Hancock (Another Name For Bridge) and Josh Bell (No Planets Strike), and musicians They Were Thieves, Matt Jones, and Hezekiah Jones.

Discography

Albums
 Dead Eyed Stranger (2001)
 Create and Consume (2003)
 Time Heals All Wounds (2004)
 Silence Is For Suckers (2005)
 The Single Road I Longed For (2006)
 A Detailed Account of Three Dreams (2006)
 Throatsleep (2006)
 A Cork Tale Wake (2007)
 A Cork Tale Wake (2008) UK
 Salt Year (2011)
 Dizzy Seas (2017)

EPs and singles
 Twilight Unlimited (2002)
 A Detailed Account of Three Dreams (2006)
 Auld Lang Syne (2007)
 Serpentine (2008) UK
 Restless (2008) UK
 Wait, Skeleton. (2008)
 Do What's Easy (2008) UK
 The Asheville Squints (2008)
 No Silver (2011)
 Poor Eliza (2011) CA
 Calvary (2016)
 Old Factory (2016)

References

External links
 Home page
 MySpace page

1982 births
Living people
People from Pecatonica, Illinois
Folk musicians from Illinois
Musicians from Ann Arbor, Michigan
University of Michigan alumni
Singer-songwriters from Illinois
Singer-songwriters from Michigan
Indie folk musicians
21st-century American singers